The 2007–08 season was the 97th season in Hajduk Split’s history and their seventeenth in the Prva HNL. Their 2nd place finish in the 2006–07 season meant it was their 17th successive season playing in the Prva HNL.

First-team squad 
Squad at end of season

Left club during season

Competitions

Overall record

Prva HNL

Classification

Results summary

Results by round

Results by opponent

Source: 2007–08 Croatian First Football League article

Matches

Prva HNL

Source: HRnogomet.com

Croatian Football Cup

Source: HRnogomet.com

UEFA Cup

First qualifying round

Second qualifying round 

Source: uefa.com

Player seasonal records

Top scorers

Source: Competitive matches

See also
2007–08 Croatian First Football League
2007–08 Croatian Football Cup

References

External sources
 2007–08 Prva HNL at HRnogomet.com
 2007–08 Croatian Cup at HRnogomet.com
 2007–08 UEFA Cup at rsssf.com

HNK Hajduk Split seasons
Hajduk Split